The following is a list of vehicles produced by Mercedes-Benz Group (formally Daimler-Benz) and their successors, ordered by year of introduction.
Models

Current production models
{| class="wikitable" style="text-align: center; width: 90%"
|-
! colspan="2" rowspan="2" |Model
! rowspan="2" width="9%" |Calendar yearintroduced
! scope="col" colspan=2|Current model
! rowspan="2" width="50%" cellpadding="32px" |Vehicle description
|- 
! width="9%" |Introduction
! width="9%" |Update/facelift
|-
| style="background-color:#e0e0e0;" colspan="7" |Hatchbacks
|-
| A-CLASS
! A-Class
| 1997
| 2018
| 2022 
| C-segment/Subcompact executive hatchback.
|-
| style="background-color:#e0e0e0;" colspan="7" |Sedans
|-
| A-CLASS
! A-Class
| 2018
| 2018
| 2022
| C-segment/Subcompact executive sedan.
|-
| C-CLASS
! C-Class
| 1993
| 2021
| –
| D-segment/compact executive sedan.
|-
| CLA
! CLA
| 2013
| 2019
| –
| C-segment/subcompact executive fastback sedan.
|-
| CLS
! CLS
| 2004
| 2018
| 2021
| E-segment/executive fastback sedan.
|-
| E-CLASS
! E-Class
| 1953
| 2017
| 2021
| E-segment/executive sedan.
|-
|EQE
!EQE
|2022
|2022
|
|All-electric E-segment fastback
|-
| EQS
! EQS
| 2021
| 2021
| –
| All-electric full-size luxury liftback.
|-
| S-CLASS
! S-Class
| 1954
| 2020
| –
| F-segment/full-size luxury sedan.
|-
| style="background-color:#e0e0e0;" colspan="7" |Wagons/Estates
|-
| C-CLASS
! C-Class
| 1993
| 2021
| –
| D-segment/compact executive station wagon.
|-
| CLA
! CLA
| 2013
| 2019
| –
| C-segment/subcompact executive station wagon.
|-
| E-CLASS
! E-Class
| 1965
| 2017
| 2021
| E-segment/executive station wagon.
|-
| style="background-color: #e0e0e0;" colspan=6 |Coupes/Convertibles
|-
| E-CLASS
! E-Class
| 1968
| 2017
| 2021
| E-segment/executive coupe and convertible.
|-
| style="background-color: #e0e0e0;" colspan=6 |Crossovers/SUVs
|-
| EQA
! EQA
| 2021
| 2021
| –
| All-electric subcompact luxury crossover SUV.
|-
| EQB
! EQB
| 2021
| 2021
| –
| All-electric subcompact luxury crossover SUV.
|-
| EQC
! EQC
| 2019
| 2019
| –
| All-electric compact luxury crossover SUV and the first member in the new Mercedes-Benz EQ lineup of electric vehicles.
|-
| G-CLASS
! G-Class
| 1979
| 2018
| –
| Mid-size luxury SUV. Commonly known as the G-Wagen.
|-
| GLA
! GLA
| 2013
| 2020
| –
| C-segment/subcompact luxury crossover SUV.
|-
| GLB
! GLB
| 2019
| 2019
| –
| C-segment/compact luxury crossover SUV.
|-
| GLC
! GLC
| 2015
| 2015
| 2020
| Compact luxury crossover SUV/coupe SUV.
|-
| GLE
! GLE
| 1997
| 2019
| –
| Mid-size luxury crossover SUV. Formerly the M-Class until 2015.
|-
| GLS
! GLS
| 2006
| 2020
| –
| Full-size luxury SUV. Formerly the GL-Class until 2015.
|-
| style="background-color: #e0e0e0;" colspan=6 |Roadsters/Sports cars
|-
| AMG GT
! AMG GT
| 2014
| 2014
| 2017
| Front mid-engine, rear-wheel drive two- and four-seater grand tourer coupe and roadster.
|-
| AMG GT 4-DOOR COUPÉ
! AMG GT 4-Door Coupé
| 2018
| 2018
| 2021
| Front-engine, rear-wheel-drive 5-door liftback sedan.
|-
| AMG SL
! AMG SL
| 1954
| 2022
| –
| Front-engine, rear-wheel-drive two-seater grand tourer sports coupe and roadster.
|-
| AMG ONE
! AMG One
| 2022
| 2022
| –
| Rear mid-engine, all-wheel-drive limited-production plug-in hybrid sports car. Concept model pictured.
|-
| style="background-color: #e0e0e0;" colspan=6 |Minivans/MPVs
|-
| B-CLASS
! B-Class
| 2005
| 2018
| 2022
| C-segment/subcompact executive MPV.
|-
| T-CLASS/CITAN VAN
! Citan Van
| 2012
| 2021
| –
| LAV Version Of Citan.
|-
| V-CLASS/VIANO
! Viano
| 1997
| 2014
| –
| Minivan Version OF Vito.
|-
| EQV
! EQV
| 2020
| 2020
| –
| All-electric version of the Vito.
|-
| style="background-color: #e0e0e0;" colspan=6 |Vans
|-
| VITO
! Vito
| 1996
| 2014
| –
| Light commercial vehicle (Vito) and minivan (V-Class/Viano).
|-
| CITAN
! Citan
| 2012
| 2022
| –
| Panel van and leisure activity vehicle, a rebadged and restyled Renault Kangoo.
|-
| SPRINTER
! Sprinter
| 1995
| 2019
| –
| Light commercial vehicle and large van. Also marketed by Freightliner Trucks as the Freightliner Sprinter from 2001 to 2021 and by Dodge as the Dodge Sprinter from 2003 to 2009.
|-
| Metris
! Metris
| 2016
| 2016
| –
| A North American Version Of The Vito.
|-
| style="background-color: #e0e0e0;" colspan=6 |Commercial trucks
|-
| AROCS
! Arocs
| 2013
| 2013
| –
| Heavy-duty truck.
|-
| ATEGO
! Atego
| 1998
| 2013
| –
| Rigid truck.
|-
| ACTROS
! Actros
| 1996
| 2011
| 2019
| Heavy-duty truck.
|-
| ECONIC
! Econic
| 1998
| 1998
| –
| Low-entry truck.
|-
| UNIMOG
! Unimog
| 1948
| 2013
| –
| All-wheel-drive medium-duty trucks.
|-
| ZETROS
! Zetros
| 2008
| 2008
| –
| Off-road truck.
|-
| style="background-color: #e0e0e0;" colspan=6 |Buses and coaches
|-
| CITARO! Citaro
| 1997
| 2011
| –
| Single-deck integral bus.
|-
| SPRINTER MINIBUS! Sprinter
| 1995
| 2019
| –
| Passenger minibus version of the Sprinter.
|-
| TOURISMO'! Tourismo
| 1994
| 2017
| –
| Single-deck integral coach.
|-
! colspan="2" rowspan="2" |Model
! rowspan="2" |Calendar yearintroduced
! Introduction (model code)
! Update/facelift
! rowspan="2" |Vehicle description
|-
! colspan="2" |Current model
|}

 Cars produced 
 1920s 

400 (1924-1929)
630 (1926–1929)
W02 8/38 PS, Stuttgart 200 (1926-1933)
W03 12/55 PS, 300 (1926-1927)
W04 300 (1927-1928)
W06 S-Series, roadster (1927–1932)
SSK
W05 350 (1928)
680S (1928)
W08 Nürburg 460/500, large luxury car (1928-1939)
W05 350 (1929-1930)
W10 Mannheim 350/370/380, grand tourer (1929–1934)
W11 10/50 PS, Stuttgart 200/260 (1929-1934)
W37 L 1000 Express, light van based on the W11 (1929-1932)

 1930s 

W07 770, full-size luxury car (1930–1938)
W15 170 (1931-1936)
W19 380 S, grand tourer (1932–1933)
W22 380, large luxury car (1933-1934)
W21 200, mid-size luxury car (1933-1936)
W18 290, full-size luxury car (1933-1937)
W23 130H, (1934–1936)
W29 500K, roadster (1934–1936)
W31 Type G4, (1934–1939)
W30 150H, prototype sport racing car (1935–1936)
W136 170V, mid-size car (1935-1942)
W28 170 H (1936-1939)
W138 260D, full-size luxury car (1936–1940)
W29 540K, roadster (1936–1943)
W143 230, mid-size luxury car (1937-1941)
W152 Type G5 (1937-1941)
W142 320, large luxury car (1937-1942)
W149 200V (1938-1939)
W136K 170 VK (1938-1942)
W150 770, full-size luxury car (1938–1943)
W153 230, mid-size luxury car (1938-1943)

 1940s 
Production during 1939-1945 was disrupted from World War II, and was restarted in 1946.
W136 170V, mid-size car (1946–1955)
W191 170S, mid-size executive car (1949–1955)

 1950s 

W187 220, full-size luxury car (1951–1955)
W186 300, grand tourer (1951–1957)
W188 300S/300Sc, luxury car (1951–1958)
W120 180, mid-size executive car (1953–1962)
W180 220a/220S, luxury car (1954–1959)
W198 300SL, grand tourer (1954–1963)
R121 190SL, roadster (1955–1963)
L319, light commercial van (1955–1968)
W105 219, luxury car (1956–1959)
W121 190, mid-size executive car (1956-1961)
W189 300d, full-size luxury car (1957–1960)
W128 220SE, executive car (1958–1960)
W111 220/220S/220SE/230S/250SE/280SE, full-size luxury car (1959–1971)

 1960s 
W110 190c/200/200D/230, mid-size luxury car (1961–1968)
W112 300SE, full-size luxury car (1961–1967)
W113 230SL/250SL/280SL, roadster (1963–1970)
W100 600, full-size luxury car (1963–1981)
W108/W109 250S/250SE/280S/280SE/280SEL/300S/300SEL, full-size luxury car (1965–1973)
W114/W115 200/230/230/240/250/280, mid-size executive car (1968-1976)
T2, light commercial van (1968–1996)

 1970s 

R107 SL-Class, roadster (1971–1989)
C107 SLC-Class, grand tourer (1971–1981)
W116 S-Class, full-size luxury car (1972–1980)
W123, mid-size executive car (1976–1986)
W126 S-Class, full-size luxury car (1979–1992)
W460 G-Class, off-road SUV (1979–1990)

 1980s 

Mercedes-Benz W123, executive class car (1975-1986)
MB100, light commercial van (1981–1995)
W201 190, compact executive car (1982–1993)
W124 E-Class, mid-size executive car (1985–1994)
R129 SL-Class, grand tourer roadster (1989–2002)

 1990s 

W168 A-Class, subcompact car (1997–2004)
W202 C-Class, compact executive car (1993–2000)
C215 CL-Class, grand tourer (1998–2006)
C208 CLK-Class, mid-size luxury car (1997–2003)
W210 E-Class, mid-size executive car (1996–2002)
W463 G-Class, luxury SUV (1990–2018)
W163 M-Class, mid-size SUV (1997–2004)
W140 S-Class, full-size luxury car (1991–1998)
W220 S-Class, full-size luxury car (1998–2005)
R170 SLK-Class, compact roadster (1996–2003)
W901 Sprinter, light commercial van (1995–2006)
W670 Vario, full-size commercial van (1996–2013)
W638 Vito, light commercial van (1996–2003)

 2000s 
alt=|thumb|Mercedes-Benz CLS-Class (W219)

W169 A-Class, subcompact car (2005–2011)
W245 B-Class, subcompact MPV (2006–2011)
W203 C-Class, compact executive car (2001–2007)
W204 C-Class, compact executive car (2008–2013)
C216 CL-Class, grand tourer (2006–2014)
C209 CLK-Class, mid-size luxury car (2002–2010)
W219 CLS-Class, mid-size luxury car (2004–2010)
W211 E-Class, mid-size executive car (2003–2008)
W212 E-Class, mid-size executive car (2009–2016)
X164 GL-Class, full-size luxury SUV (2006–2012)
X204 GLK-Class, compact luxury crossover (2008–2015)
W164 M-Class, mid-size luxury SUV (2005–2011)
W251 R-Class, luxury MPV (2005–2017)
W221 S-Class, full-size luxury car (2006–2013)
R230 SL-Class, grand tourer (2001–2011)
R171 SLK-Class, compact roadster (2004–2010)
C199 SLR McLaren, grand tourer (2003–2010)
W906 NCV3 Sprinter, light commercial van (2006–2018)
W414 Vaneo, compact MPV (2002–2005)
W639 Vito, light commercial van (2003–2014)

 2010s 

C197 SLS AMG, sports car (2010–2014)
W218 CLS, mid-size luxury car (2011–2018)
R172 SLK, compact roadster (2011–2020)
W246 B-Class, subcompact MPV (2012–2018)
X166 GL-Class, full-size luxury SUV (2012–present)
W415 Citan, MPV van (2012–present)
W176 A-Class, subcompact car (2013–2018)
R231 SL-Class, grand tourer roadster (2013–present)
W222 S-Class, full-size luxury car (2013–2023)
C117 CLA, subcompact executive car (2013–2019)
X156 GLA, subcompact luxury crossover (2013–present)
W205 C-Class, compact executive car (2014–present)
W447 Vito, light commercial van (2014–present)
C190 AMG GT, sports car (2015–present)
X253 GLC, compact luxury SUV (2015–present)
W213 E-Class, mid-size executive car (2016–present)
BR470 X-Class, luxury pickup truck (2017–2020)
W177 A-Class, subcompact car (2018–present)
C257 CLS, mid-size luxury car (2018–present)
X290 AMG GT 4-Door Coupé, Executive Car, 5 door liftback (2019–present)
W463 G-Class, mid-size luxury SUV (2018–present)
N293 EQC, fully electric compact SUV (2019–present)
W167 GLE, mid-size SUV (2019–present)
W247 B-Class, subcompact MPV (2019–present)
C118 CLA-Class, subcompact executive car (2019–present)
X247 GLB, compact luxury SUV (2019–present)
X167 GLS, full-size luxury SUV (2019–present)

2020s
H247 GLA, subcompact luxury crossover (2020–present)
W223 S-Class, full-size luxury saloon (2020–present)
W206 C-Class, compact executive car (2021–present)
H243 EQA, electric subcompact luxury crossover (2021–present)
X243 EQB, electric compact luxury crossover (2021–present)
V297 EQS, electric full-size liftback (2021–present)
R232 AMG SL, grand tourer roadster (2022–present)
V295 EQE, electric executive saloon (2022)
R50 One, limited production plug-in hybrid super sports car (2022)
EQE SUV, electric SUV (2023)

 Concept cars 

 1920s 
 1926 Mercedes-Benz M 23 D (W01)
 1926 Mercedes-Benz 5/25 PS (W01)
 1926 Mercedes-Benz G1 (W103)
 1928 Mercedes-Benz 5/25 PS (W14)

 1930s 
1931-1932 Mercedes-Benz 120H (W17)
1933 Mercedes-Benz 175 (W25D)
1934-1936 Mercedes-Benz 150V (W130)
1935 Mercedes-Benz 170VG (W133 III)
1936 Mercedes-Benz 170VL (W139)
1936-1937 Mercedes-Benz 130VB (W144)
1936-1937 Mercedes-Benz 190VB (W145)
1936-1937 Mercedes-Benz 260VB (W146)
1938 Mercedes-Benz 400V (W147)
1938 Mercedes-Benz 400VM (W160)
1938 Mercedes-Benz 400VMS (W161)
1939-1940 Mercedes-Benz 580K (W129)

 1940s 
1940 Mercedes-Benz 260, 260 LWB (W159)
1941-1942 Mercedes-Benz 600 K, 600 V (W148)
1941-1942 Mercedes-Benz 600 K (W157)

 1960s 
1966 Mercedes-Benz SL-X
1969 Mercedes-Benz C111

 1970s 

1978 Mercedes-Benz CW311

 1980s 
1981 Mercedes-Benz Auto 2000
1982 Mercedes-Benz NAFA

 1990s 
1991 Mercedes-Benz C112
1991 Mercedes-Benz F100
1993 Mercedes-Benz Coupe Concept
1993 Mercedes-Benz Vision A93 Concept
1994 Mercedes-Benz S500 Shooting Brake
1994 Mercedes-Benz FCC

1994 Mercedes-Benz SLK I and II
1995 Mercedes-Benz Vario Research Car
1996 Mercedes-Benz F200 Imagination
1996 Mercedes-Benz AAV
1997 Mercedes-Benz F300 Life Jet
1999 Mercedes-Benz Vision SLR

 2000s 
2000 Mercedes-Benz Vision SLA
2002 Mercedes-Benz Vision GST
2002 Mercedes-Benz F400 Carving
2003 Mercedes-Benz Vision CLS
2003 Mercedes-Benz F500 Mind
2004 Mercedes-Benz Vision-B
2004 Mercedes-Benz Vision-R
2005 Mercedes-Benz F600 HYGENIUS
2005 Mercedes-Benz Bionic
2007 Mercedes-Benz Ocean Drive
2007 Mercedes-Benz F700
2008 Mercedes-Benz ConceptFASCINATION
2009 Mercedes-Benz BlueZERO
2009 Mercedes-Benz F-Cell Roadster

 2010s 
2010 Mercedes-Benz F800 Style
2010 Mercedes-Benz BIOME
2010 Mercedes-Benz BlitzenBenz
2011 Mercedes-Benz F125
2011 Mercedes-Benz Silver Lightning
2011 Mercedes-Benz Unimog Concept
2012 Mercedes-Benz Ener-G-Force
2013 Mercedes-Benz Concept GLA SUV
2013 Mercedes-Benz AMG Vision Gran Turismo
2014 Mercedes-Benz Vision G-Code
2015 Mercedes-Benz Intelligent Aerodynamic Automobile
2015 Mercedes-Benz F 015
2015 Mercedes-Benz G500 4×4²
2016 Mercedes-Benz Vision Mercedes-Maybach 6
2016 Mercedes-Benz Vision Van
2017 Mercedes-Benz EQA
2017 Mercedes-Maybach 6 Cabriolet
2018 Mercedes-Benz EQ Silver Arrow
2018 Mercedes-Benz Vision Urbanetic
2019 Mercedes-Benz Concept GLB
2019 Mercedes-Benz Vision EQS
2019 Mercedes-Benz Vision Mercedes Simplex

 2020s 
2020 Mercedes-Benz Vision AVTR
2021 Mercedes-Benz EQG
2021 Mercedes-Benz Concept EQT
2021 Mercedes-Benz Maybach EQS
2022 Mercedes-Benz Vision EQXX
2023 Mercedes-Benz Vision AMG

 Motorsport cars See Mercedes-Benz in motorsport''

1923 Benz Tropfenwagen
1928–1932 Mercedes-Benz SSK Rennwagen
1934 Mercedes-Benz W25
1937 Mercedes-Benz W125
1938–1939 Mercedes-Benz W154
1939 Mercedes-Benz W165
1952 Mercedes-Benz W194
1955 Mercedes-Benz 300 SLR
1987 Sauber Mercedes-Benz C9
1997–1998 Mercedes-Benz CLK GTR
1999 Mercedes-Benz CLR
2004–2006 Mercedes-Benz AMG C-Class DTM (W203)
2007–2011 Mercedes-Benz AMG C-Class DTM (W204)
2011–2018 Mercedes-AMG C-Coupé DTM

Formula One 
1954–1955 Mercedes-Benz W196
2010 Mercedes MGP W01
2011 Mercedes MGP W02
2012 Mercedes F1 W03
2013 Mercedes F1 W04
2014 Mercedes F1 W05 Hybrid
2015 Mercedes F1 W06 Hybrid
2016 Mercedes F1 W07 Hybrid
2017 Mercedes AMG F1 W08 EQ Power+
2018 Mercedes AMG F1 W09 EQ Power+
2019 Mercedes AMG F1 W10 EQ Power+
2020 Mercedes-AMG F1 W11 EQ Performance
2021 Mercedes-AMG F1 W12 E Performance
2022 Mercedes-AMG F1 W13 E Performance

Formula E 
2019-20 Mercedes-Benz EQ Silver Arrow 01
2020-21 Mercedes-EQ Silver Arrow 02

Trucks

Buses 
Citaro: low floor city and interurban bus available in standard, midi and articulated produced since 1997
Tourismo: tourist coach produced since 1994
Travego: tourist coach produced since 1999
Atego coach: a chassis produced for external coach bodywork
Sprinter minibus: a converted cargo van produced since 1995
Cito: a low-floor midibus built by EvoBus for Continental Europe between 1999 and 2003 with diesel-electric transmission

Related brands

Cars 

Mercedes-AMG, high-performance brand
Maybach, ultra-luxury sub-brand
Smart, automotive division
DaimlerChrysler, former subsidiary
BharatBenz, Indian division
McLaren, co-produced the SLR sports car

Others 

Unimog, managed by Daimler since 1951
MTU Friedrichshafen, purchased by Daimler in 1960
Freightliner Trucks, sub-brand of Daimler Trucks North America
Setra, acquired from Kässbohrer in 1995
EvoBus

Tuners 
Brabus
Carlsson
Hamann Motorsport
Kleemann
Mansory
Renntech
MKB Tuning
AMG TAI'S/GOLABWORX

See also 
List of Mercedes-Benz engines

References

Notes

Bibliography

Cars

Trucks

Buses

 
 
 

Mercedes-Benz